The 1970 Colgate Red Raiders football team was an American football team that represented Colgate University as an independent during the 1970 NCAA University Division football season. In its third season under head coach Neil Wheelwright, the team compiled a 5–6 record. John Lennon was the team captain. 

The team played its home games at Andy Kerr Stadium in Hamilton, New York.

Schedule

Leading players 
Two trophies were awarded to the Red Raiders' most valuable players in 1970: 
 Steve Goepel, quarterback, received the Andy Kerr Trophy, awarded to the most valuable offensive player.
 John Lennon, defensive tackle, received the Hal W. Lahar Trophy, awarded to the most valuable defensive player.

Statistical leaders for the 1970 Red Raiders included: 
 Rushing: Steve Morgan, 610 yards and 7 touchdowns on 134 attempts
 Passing: Steve Goepel, 1,802 yards, 137 completions and 15 touchdowns on 309 attempts
 Receiving: Steve Fraser, 741 yards and 8 touchdowns on 44 receptions
 Total offense: Steve Goepel, 1,821 yards (1,802 passing, 19 rushing)
 Scoring: Steve Morgan, 48 points from 8 touchdowns
 All-purpose yards: Steve Fraser, 839 yards (741 receiving, 105 kickoff returning, 3 punt returning, minus-10 rushing)

References

Colgate
Colgate Raiders football seasons
Colgate Red Raiders football